The 2022 Merrimack Warriors football team represented Merrimack College as a member of the Northeast Conference (NEC) in the 2022 NCAA Division I FCS football season. The Warriors were led by tenth-year head coach Dan Curran and played their home games at Duane Stadium in North Andover, MA.

Schedule

Preseason
The Warriors added five players via transfer.

Key departures include : 
Weston Elliott (QB – 11 games, 11 started).  
Caleb Holden (CB – 11 games, 11 started).

Recruits 

|}

References

Merrimack
Merrimack Warriors football seasons
Merrimack Warriors football